Robert Little (1762 – October 5, 1827) was a Unitarian minister. He was born in England in 1762. He immigrated to the United States in 1819 because of poor health and religious restrictions in England against all churches except the Church of England. He was the first pastor of First Unitarian Church in Washington, D.C. and was instrumental in its formation in 1821. He served in that position until 1827 when he died unexpectedly.

References

External links 
 All Souls Church, Washington, D.C., 2010 
 The Unitarian, January, 1908 Vol 1

19th-century American clergy
American Unitarians
1762 births
1827 deaths